This is a list of American public-access television programs.

List

Notes

References

Citations

Sources

External links 
 Subject to Change: Guerilla Television Revisited by Deidre Boyle (Oxford University Press, 1997)
 Television and the Crisis of Democracy by Douglas Kellner (Westview Press, 1990)
 The U.S. Power Structure and the Mass Media by Frank Morrow (Ph.D dissertation, The University of Texas, 1984)

Lists of American television series
American television-related lists